The FIBA Women's Basketball World Cup All-Tournament Team is an award, that is given by FIBA, to the five best players of the FIBA Women's Basketball World Cup.

Honourees

References

External links

All-Tournament Team
Basketball trophies and awards